New Homestead is a neighborhood in the 31st Ward of Pittsburgh, Pennsylvania, USA's southeast city area.  It has a ZIP Code of 15207 and 15120, and it is represented on Pittsburgh City Council by Corey O'Connor.

Surrounding communities
New Homestead has four borders, including the Pittsburgh neighborhoods of Hays to the west and southwest and Lincoln Place to the south, and the boroughs of Munhall to the east and West Homestead to the north, northeast and east.

See also
List of Pittsburgh neighborhoods

References

External links
Interactive Pittsburgh Neighborhoods Map
New Homestead Map

Neighborhoods in Pittsburgh